Bonar Hardie (25 July 1925 – 4 August 2014) was a British sailor. He competed in the 6 Metre event at the 1948 Summer Olympics.

References

External links
 

1925 births
2014 deaths
British male sailors (sport)
Olympic sailors of Great Britain
Sailors at the 1948 Summer Olympics – 6 Metre
Sportspeople from Glasgow